The  is a high rise office building with integrated retail and restaurant facilities located in front of the Marunouchi Exit of Tokyo Station in Chiyoda ward, Tokyo. The building was completed in May 2012 and was opened to the public on March 21, 2013.

Overview
The 38 story JP Tower replaces the former central mail sorting facility of Japan Post. A large portion of the original five story low rise frontage of the Tokyo Central Post Office, designed in 1931 by Tetsuro Yoshida, was preserved and redeveloped as the Kitte retail and dining facility. JP Tower tenants include offices of the Mitsubishi UFJ Financial Group.

The basement floor connects directly to Tokyo Station, as well as other nearby buildings.

Intermediatheque
The Intermediatheque, located in the renovated Central Post Office building on the 2nd and 3rd floor, serves as a museum of academic culture and a venue for workshops and seminars open to the general public.

The Intermediatheque was launched as an academic-industry collaborative project with the support of the  University of Tokyo.  The facility is jointly operated by Japan Post and The University Museum, The University of Tokyo. Many of the furnishings and exhibits on display dating back to the Imperial University era.

References

External links 
 Kitte Retail and Dining Facilities 

Marunouchi
Skyscraper office buildings in Tokyo
Office buildings completed in 2012
Buildings and structures in Chiyoda, Tokyo
Mitsubishi Estate
Retail buildings in Tokyo
Japan Post Holdings
2012 establishments in Japan